Rostock Torfbrücke station is a railway station in the town of Rostock, Mecklenburg-Vorpommern, Germany.

References

Torfbrucke